Bhendali village is situated in Niphad Taluka of Nashik district, Maharashtra State, India.

Statistics 
It is located 31 km east of Nashik, 14 km from the Niphad district and 195 km From the state capital Mumbai.

pin code of Bhendali is 422210 and its postal head office and Police Station is in Saykheda.

Nearby villages are Mahajanpur (1 km), Songaon (5 km) Ramnagar (4 km), Bhuse (5 km), Pimpalgaon Nipani (6 km). Bhendali is surrounded by Sinnar to the South, Nashik to the west, Chandwad to the North, and Kopargaon to the East.

Bhendali has a gram panchayat, which was established on 25 April 2000, and has a total area of 662.83 hectares. 615.9 hectares are covered by Agriculture, 27.97 hectares are vacant land and the remaining 19.77 hectares are covered by "gayran", "Road", "leke", "panthal" etc.

According to 2011 Population survey. The Population of Bhendali 2247
Male - 1183
Female - 1064
Backward Cast - 162
other - 240

Sarpanchs of Bhendali:
 Balasaheb Sadashiv Khalkar (25/10/2000 To 12/8/2002)
 Sudhakar Pandharinath Khalkar (13/8/2002 To 24/10/2005)
 Deepak Bhaskar Kamankar (25/10/2005 to 21/10/2010)
 Usha Sharad Khalkar (22/10/2010 to 19/10/2015)
* Gorakh Sampat Khalkar (20/10/2015 to till date)

Connectivity of Bhendali
Public Bus Service	Available - > within village,
Private Bus Service	->Available within 5 – 10 km distance,
Railway Station	-> Available within 14+ km distance (Kherwadi,Niphad,Sukene etc.)

Demographics of Bhendali:
Marathi, Urdu, is the Local Language here

Schools in Bhendali
Anu Madhyamik Vidyalaya
Address: bhendali, niphad, Nashik, Maharashtra. PIN- 422210, Post - Saykheda
Z.p.school Bhendali No 2
Address: bhendali, niphad, Nashik, Maharashtra. PIN- 422210, Post - Saykheda
Z.p.school Bhendali No 1
Address: bhendali, niphad, Nashik, Maharashtra. PIN- 422210, Post - Saykheda

References

External links
https://villageinfo.in/maharashtra/nashik/niphad/bhendali.html

Villages in Nashik district
2000 establishments in India